Gunne Sax is a retired clothing label owned by Jessica McClintock, Inc., which specialized in formal and semi-formal wear for young women. Eleanor Bailey and Carol Miller co-founded the label in  San Francisco in 1967, before partnering with McClintock in 1969 for a $5,000 investment.

The name "Gunne Sax" was  associated with the label's roots in prairie, Victorian, and Edwardian-styled designs which drew on many elements popular in late-19th and early-20th-century American fashion such as lace, gingham, and calico. The enterprise was named after the "gunny sack" (hessian/burlap bag) or trim used on some of the earlier dresses.

Gunne Sax also manufactured renaissance- and medieval-inspired designs, with empire waistlines and middle plackets, and used other historical costume elements such as corset-like laced bodices and puffed sleeves that tightened below the elbow, a style popular throughout the 1970s and 1980s known as "leg o'mutton."  Collectors consider clothing with the original "black label," used only in 1969, the most valuable.  A "hearts label" was used for a short time following, until the 1970s and early 1980s larger label with scrollwork was put into use.

From the 1980s and beyond, Gunne Sax dresses tended to follow modern prom dress sensibilities, such as tight, strapless bodices and full skirts, favoring fabrics like satin, taffeta, and tulle. In 1999 taffeta was the number one seller paired with matte satin or brocade corsets, with an addition of skirts made in tulle or dotted swiss.

Gunne Sax also had a children/young girls' line referred to as Jeunes Filles.

References

External links
"Design empire began with Gunne Sax" SFGate, Carolyne Zinko, February 13, 2011

Clothing brands